Professional Coin Grading Service (PCGS) is an American third-party coin grading, authentication, attribution, and encapsulation service founded in 1985. The intent of its seven founding dealers, including the firm's former president David Hall, was to standardize grading. The firm has divisions in Europe and Asia, and is owned by parent company Collectors Universe. PCGS has graded over 42.5 million coins, medals, and tokens valued at over $36 billion.

History
PCGS was founded in 1985 by seven dealers, including the firm's former president, David Hall. The founders' intent was to establish definitive grading standards, backed by a guarantee of grading accuracy. PCGS began operations on February 3, 1986. The firm has since started grading foreign coins and established divisions in Europe and Asia, and was purchased by Collectors Universe.

Services
PCGS certifies most U.S. and foreign coins, which consists of grading, authenticating, attributing, and encapsulating them in clear, airtight plastic holders. PCGS services include special label programs, "First Strike" designations, True View (high quality photography), conservation, and tiered certification (priced according to values and turnaround times). Coins that are improperly cleaned, doctored, damaged, or otherwise impaired will not be numerically graded by PCGS, but upon request will still be authenticated and given verbal "details" grades.

Coin holders
The PCGS holder (aka slab) is made of clear, inert plastic and is stackable. Anti-counterfeiting measures include a hologram on the back, markings within the holder, and Near Field Communication (NFC) chip embedded in some holders. Printed on the front of the blue paper insert is the coin's type, denomination, grade, attribution, pedigree (if any), serial number, Universal Product Code (UPC), and other pertinent information. First-generation PCGS coin holders are smaller and lack the raised stackable edges of later issues. Their insert was printed on plain white paper. In some of these early holders, the coin will be loose enough to produce noise when the holder is handled, thus their "rattler" nickname.

PCGS was at one point named the official grading service of the Professional Numismatic Guild; during that time, the PNG logo was included on the holder. This design was replaced with a different one when PNG switched their affiliation to NGC.

Population report
PCGS maintains a census of all coins they have graded since their inception, revealing each issue's grades, variety, designations (such as "prooflike" for Morgan dollars and "full bands" for Mercury dimes), and other significant information. Access to this report is free and updated daily on their website, though a discontinued hardcopy version was published at monthly intervals.

Analysis of the population report, and a similar report published by NGC, has allowed rarity estimates to be made of specific coins. Over time these two data bases have revealed some coins once thought rare to be remarkably common, whereas others thought more common have shown to be likely few in number. The population reports are followed closely by numismatic professionals, who recognize that population numbers can be inflated through multiple submissions of the same coins broken out of their holders and resubmitted with the hope of receiving a higher grade. Population figures can also be artificially low due to the reluctance to submit inexpensive coins—for a service that may cost more than the coins are worth.

PCGS CoinFacts
PCGS maintains CoinFacts, the "single source of information on U.S. coins." The free site publishes information about all federal and most non-federal U.S. coin issues, including their rarity statistics, PCGS Price Guide values, population data, public auction performances, die varieties, and photographs.

Price guide
PCGS publishes a free, partial online list of U.S. and foreign coin values. The values listed are for PCGS-certified coins and are compiled from dealer advertisements and price lists, auction prices realized, and trade show transactions.

PCGS Set Registry
In 2001, PCGS established its free Set Registry program, which includes an online leader board that allowed collectors to compete against each other in thousands of potential sets composed of PCGS-graded coins. More than 113,000 sets are hosted. Each coin in a set is given a value computed by its relative scarcity. A version of the Registry is also maintained by PCGS' main competitor, NGC.

Dealer survey
A survey of major coin dealers, conducted by the trade associations the Professional Numismatists Guild (PNG) and the Industry Council For Tangible Assets (ICTA), revealed the dealers' "Superior" rating for PCGS, the highest given for any service. Of the other 10 grading services evaluated in the survey, only the Numismatic Guaranty Corporation (NGC) also received the "Superior" rating. Survey respondents were asked for their professional opinions to evaluate 11 grading services based on 12 different weighted criteria, such as grading and authentication accuracy. Each category was ranked by the respondents on a 10-point scale ranging from the lowest, "Unacceptable", to the highest, "Outstanding".

Controversies

In 1990 the Federal Trade Commission filed a civil action against PCGS alleging exaggerated advertising claims. A settlement was reached in which PCGS did not admit wrongdoing but agreed to submit its advertising for review for five years, and include a disclaimer in its ads.

See also 
 Coin collecting
 Currency
 First Strike Coins

References

External links 
 Professional Coin Grading Service
 PCGS Coin Facts
 Coin World

Coin grading
Business services companies established in 1985